Shankar Rao may refer to

 B. Shankar Rao (born 1922), Indian flautist
 P. Shankar Rao, Minister and M.L.A from Cantonment constituency
 Shankar Rao Kharat, Marathi language writer
 Shankar Rao (cricketer) (born 1982), Indian cricketer